The South Nashua River is a river in Massachusetts that flows  through Clinton and Lancaster. It starts at the Wachusett Dam on the Wachusett Reservoir and ends by joining the North Nashua River to form the Nashua River.

See also 
 Rivers of Massachusetts

References 
http://www.nashuariverwatershed.org/

Rivers of Massachusetts